Wennerberg is a Swedish surname that may refer to
Eric Wennerberg (1917–2001), Swedish bobsledder
Gunnar Wennerberg (1817–1901), Swedish poet, composer and politician
Mattias Wennerberg (born 1981), Swedish ice hockey forward
Sara Wennerberg-Reuter (1875–1959), Swedish organist and composer

See also
Wennberg

Swedish-language surnames